Syed Shah Muhammad Ozair Munemi (1899–1961) was an Indian independence activist. He was born into a wealthy Zamindar family of Phulwari Sharif, Bihar, son of Deputy Magistrate Syed Abdul Aziz.

Education

Munemi passed his middle school in Phulwarisharif in 1909. The school was established by his maternal grandfather Syed Mummad Umar. In 1918, he cleared his metric exam from Muhammadan Anglo Arabic School, Patna City. He was admitted to B. N. College, Patna, but left to join the non-cooperation movement in 1920–21. Munemi completed a graduate degree from Bihar National Vidhyapeth, Patna (Sadaqat Ashram).

He was appointed Professor of Urdu and Persian at Bihar National Vidhyapeth during 1926–1930. He then became the secretary of Bihar Provincial Congress Committee during 1931–1942. His close friend, Dr Rajendra Prasad, was its president at that time. Munemi was later appointed Chairman of Bihar Central Relief Committee of Congress in 1934.

Career

Along will Dr Rajendra Prasad, Mahatma Gandhi, Khan Abdul Ghaffar Khan and all members of the Nation Congress, Munemi was arrested during 1942–44, held first in Patna Jail and later transferred to Hazaribagh Central Jail. Munemi became President of Patna District Congress Committee (1940–41). While he was president, he donated 8-10 katthas of land to Bihar provincial Congress Committee which is near at Congress Maidan, KadamKuan. In 1946, he was elected to the Bihar Legislative Council. In 1949, Munemi was elected deputy chairman of Bihar legislative council.

When Gandhi, Mulana Mazhar-ul-Haque and Mulana Shaukat Ali came to Patna they visited Phulwarisharif with him. Munemi founded the "National School", which was formally inaugurated by both Gandhi and Abul Kalam Azad. Azad gave his honorary services to this school.

In 1952, he established Phulwari Sharif High school and became its president.

On April 29 of the same year, Munemi was included in the first cabinet of late Dr. S. K. Sinha. He became the minister for the Jail, Relief and Rehabilitation portfolios. In the second Congress cabinet, Munemi added the transportation portfolio. On January 2, 1961, he served for the 3rd time. He was the only minister to hold the ministry for three consecutive cabinets of Congress with more than three departments.

He married Husana Khatoon, daughter of Shah Musa (elder brother of Shah Haroon, founder of Haroon Nagar, Patna), in 1939.  As written in Bihar Vidhan Parishad, Sadasya Parichaya said that he was very religious, humble and modest. Munemi died while a minister.

Prison reforms 

He instituted many prison reforms during his ministry:

 Prison library
 School exams
 Pay for labor, weaving of Qaleen and commercial sorghum. 
 Participation in the Sonepur mella on the occasion of Kartik Purnima. 
 Paid work as road construction labourers

External links

References 

1899 births
1961 deaths
Indian independence activists from Bihar
Politicians from Patna
Indian Muslims